Johan Martin van der Horst (born 2 April 1965 in Heemskerk, North Holland) is a retired volleyball player from the Netherlands, who represented his native country at two Summer Olympics (1992 and 2000). He was a member of the Dutch national team that won the silver medal in Barcelona, Spain (1992).

Individual awards
 1991 FIVB World League "Best Blocker"

References
  Dutch Olympic Committee

1965 births
Living people
People from Heemskerk
Dutch men's volleyball players
Volleyball players at the 1992 Summer Olympics
Volleyball players at the 2000 Summer Olympics
Olympic silver medalists for the Netherlands
Olympic volleyball players of the Netherlands
Olympic medalists in volleyball

Medalists at the 1992 Summer Olympics
Sportspeople from North Holland
20th-century Dutch people